Annabel Thérèse Keswick, Lady Keswick (née Fraser; 15 October 1942 – 13 September 2022), styled "The Honourable", was a Scottish lady from the Fraser family who married Lord Reay and then Sir Henry Keswick.  She was influential in British politics as the special advisor to Kenneth Clarke and then as director of the Centre for Policy Studies.  She was Chancellor of the University of Buckingham from 2014 to 2020.

Professional career
Keswick served as a special policy advisor to Kenneth Clarke from 1989 to 1995. During that time she worked at the Department of State for Health, the Department of Education and Science, the Home Office and HM Treasury.

After resigning from this position in 1995, she became executive director of the Centre for Policy Studies, eventually becoming its deputy chairman from January 2004 until April 2017. In this role she contributed to, commissioned and published over 100 public policy pamphlets on the European Union, the Constitution, law and order, education, health, tax and regulatory affairs and women's issues. She has written on these subjects for most of the national newspapers, and appeared on radio and on television.

Journalism
Keswick has contributed articles for The Daily Telegraph, The New Statesman, Financial Times, and The Spectator, among other publications.

Books
On 9 January 2020, Keswick published The Colour of the Sky After Rain, about her impression of the Chinese people and their culture after decades of travel to China and the Far East.

Other positions
In September 2013, Keswick was appointed a director of Daily Mail and General Trust. In the same month, she was elected chancellor of the University of Buckingham, a position she held until 2020.

She was a patron of the British Museum, the National Gallery and the Victoria and Albert Museum. In July 2007 she became a Fellow of King's College London.

Personal life and death 
Keswick was the daughter of Simon Fraser, 15th Lord Lovat and Rosamond Delves (née Broughton). She was married firstly to Hugh Mackay, 14th Lord Reay, and then to businessman Sir Henry Keswick from 1985. 

Keswick died of ovarian cancer on 13 September 2022, at the age of 79.

References 

1942 births
2022 deaths
Clan Fraser
Daughters of barons
Fellows of King's College London
Reay
People associated with the University of Buckingham
Wives of knights